Aidan O'Halloran is an Irish former rugby union player.

Career
In his first season of senior rugby, O'Halloran played fly-half for Young Munster as they won the 1992–93 All-Ireland League. He would go on to win two caps for Munster in 1996, against Samoa and Connacht.

References

External links
Munster Profile

Living people
Rugby union players from Limerick (city)
Irish rugby union players
Young Munster players
Munster Rugby players
Rugby union fly-halves
Year of birth missing (living people)